Junglee is a 2019 Indian Hindi-language action-adventure film directed by American filmmaker Chuck Russell and produced by Junglee Pictures. Starring Vidyut Jammwal, Pooja Sawant, Asha Bhat, and  Atul Kulkarni, the film revolves around a veterinary doctor who upon returning to his father's elephant reserve, encounters and fights against an international poacher's racket. The film features martial arts and action stunts performed by Jammwal.

The initial release date was moved up a week to give the action thriller Romeo Akbar Walter a solo release.
Initially scheduled for release on 19 October 2018, and then for 5 April, it was released on 29 March 2019. Critics have given the film mostly positive reviews, praising the cinematography and action scenes performed by Jammwal himself.

Plot
Dipankar Nair (Thalaivasal Vijay) runs an Elephant sanctuary but things have turned bad as hunters are frequently killing elephants for their tusks. His son Raj (Vidyut Jammwal), a veterinarian in Mumbai, arrives for the 10th anniversary of his mother's death and visits Bhola and Didi, his elephant playmates when he was a child. Keshav (Atul Kulkarni), a hunter, has an eye on huge tusks of Bhola which could fetch good money. Keshav kills Bhola for his tusks and Dipankar who tries to save him. The cops arrive at the funeral of Dipankar and falsely implicate him of being with hunters and also frame Raj for it. After being taken into the prison, Raj, has his hands tied, but he still fights them all, and frees himself after Didi pulls the window out with Shankara (Pooja Sawant), Raj's childhood friend, as her mahout, with Meera (Asha Bhat), a reporter who has come with Raj to write an article on the elephant sanctuary. Raj also reveals to them that the Inspector who framed him for being with hunters, is a part of the group who supports elephant's tusk smuggling.

Dev (Akshay Oberoi), Raj's best friend, is also revealed to be with the hunters. Dev and Raj fight, after which the hunters come. They injure Raj and kill Dev, who in turn, was in a bid to save Raj. The hunters also capture Shankara, while Meera captures all this in a video. Gajja Guru (Makarand Deshpande), Raj's teacher, nurses Raj, with Meera. Raj, with a dead hunter's phone, gets to know that the buyers are in Paradeep, where Shankara is also kept. Raj attacks the factory, and kills all the bodyguards and hunters. He saves Shankara, and Meera and Jayesh (another childhood friend of Raj) also arrive. Raj attacks Keshav and wounds him. Raj goes to save the others, and using this as an opportunity Keshav picks up his gun, but Gajja Guru and Didi arrive, and Didi kills Keshav. The buyers are captured by the police. Whereas inside, Didi is about to deliver her baby.

Three months later, Dipankar Nair's last message is shown, in which he tells that elephants are killed every 15 minutes for their tusks, and that we can still stop that by not buying products made of ivory. Didi's child Asha is also shown to Meera's millions of followers. When Raj receives a call from his office, he replies that it will be a while before he is back at work because 'Things have gotten a bit wild out here!'.

Cast
 Vidyut Jammwal as Dr. Raj Nair, Dipankar's son
 Pooja Sawant as Shankara, Raj's childhood friend
 Asha Bhat as Meera
 Atul Kulkarni as Keshav, a hunter and the main antagonist
 Akshay Oberoi as Dev
 Makarand Deshpande as Gajja Guru
 Thalaivasal Vijay as Dipankar Nair, Raj's father
 Kushal Menon as Don
 Lars Kjeldsen as Mr Vane

Production
In September 2016, it was announced that Jammwal will star as a veterinary doctor in Rohan Sippy's film titled Junglee which will "mirror a unique friendship between man and an animal." Sippy said that the idea of the film came to him after seeing the classic 1971 Salim–Javed film Haathi Mere Saathi, though it also has some similarities with Tom-Yum-Goong. However, the film later went to American director Chuck Russell, who is known for directing The Mask (1994), Eraser (1996) and The Scorpion King (2002).

Jammwal performs an animal flow style of combat for the film. His upbringing in Kerala and his background in the Indian martial art of Kalaripayattu helped him prepare for the role. As a Kalaripayattu practitioner, he grew up interacting with animals. With his prior experience as a stuntman, Jammwal performed his own stunts for the film, which impressed Russell.

While talking about his first experience directing an Indian film, Russell said that he wanted to make a film "that is true to India, but uses the music, dance and the wonderful artists in Bollywood to tell a universal story about returning to the natural world". The principal photography of the film began on 5 December 2017 and was finished in the summer of 2018. Out of 100, four elephants were selected for the film after scouting in India and Sri Lanka. Junglee was shot in Thailand. The scenes involving elephants were shot in the presence of Thai crew members. Few scenes were also shot in the Jungles of Odisha and West Bengal.

Release
The film  released on 29 March 2019. The film was made available as video on demand through Hotstar on 25 May 2019.

Reception

Critical response
Saibal Chatterjee writing for NDTV rates the film with one and a half stars out of five and says, "Jammwal is about the only bright spot in a pulpy action-adventure film." Renuka Vyavahare of Times Of India gives three and half stars out of five and says, "Watch Junglee for its spellbinding action, cute elephants and gorgeous jungles. Such an adventurous and brave attempt is rare in Hindi cinema." Priyanka Sinha Jha of News18 rates the film with two stars out of five and feels that the film is a big disappointment. Writing for The Indian Express Shubhra Gupta gives it two stars out of five and finds the film comic book simple. Devesh Sharma of Filmfare giving three stars out of five says, "All-in-all, Junglee is an action-packed adventure which also tells us that we share this planet with lots of different species, who have an equal right to it..." Anupama Chopra of Film Companion gives two stars out of five with remarks, "The film’s intentions are admirable and the action is carried off with conviction, but the humans have the depth of cartoon characters." Nandini Ramnath of Scroll.in writes, "The message of Junglee is deadly serious, but its solutions belong firmly in the realm of the children’s movie."

Box office
Junglee earned  on its opening day in India. It earned  in its opening week in India. It earned  in the domestic market.

Soundtrack

The music of the film is composed by Sameer Uddin while the lyrics are penned by Anvita Dutt Guptan and Kumar Suryavanshi.

References

External links
 
 
 
 

2019 films
2010s Hindi-language films
2010s action adventure films
Films with screenplays by Ritesh Shah
Films shot in Thailand
Films about elephants
Indian action adventure films
Indian martial arts films
Films set in jungles
Films set in Mumbai
Films set in Odisha
Films set in Taipei
Kalarippayattu films
2019 martial arts films
Films about animal rights
Films directed by Chuck Russell